Oscar Castelo (May 20, 1903 – June 20, 1982) was a judge of the Manila Court and Secretary of National Defense of the Philippines.
Born in Cabanatuan, Nueva Ecija, Castelo enrolled at the San Juan de Letran and later at Escuela de Derecho. He was admitted to the Philippine Bar in 1927 and was equally fluent in English and Spanish. He later moved to United States, where he died on June 20, 1982, aged 79.

See also
Department of National Defense
List of Cabinets of the Philippines

References

Castelo's Biography

1903 births
1982 deaths
Secretaries of National Defense of the Philippines
20th-century Filipino judges
Colegio de San Juan de Letran alumni
University of Santo Tomas alumni
People from Cabanatuan
Quirino administration cabinet members